El Fuerte is a city and El Fuerte Municipality its surrounding municipality in the northwestern Mexican state of Sinaloa. The city population reported in the 2010 census was 12,566 people.

El Fuerte, meaning "The Fort", was given a Pueblo Mágico ("Magical Town") touristic label in 2009, due to its many attractions, its historical importance and its appealing small-town colonial aura.

History

The city was founded in 1563 by the Spanish conquistador Francisco de Ibarra, the first European explorer of the lofty Sierra Madre Occidental mountains. In 1610 a fort was built to ward off the fierce Zuaque and Tehueco Native Americans, who constantly harassed the Spaniards. For years, El Fuerte served as the gateway to the vast frontiers of the northern territories of Sonora, Arizona and California, all of which were sparsely populated by unyielding tribes of native amerindians. 
 
For nearly three centuries it was the most important commercial and agricultural center of the vast northwestern region of Mexico. El Fuerte was a chief trading post for silver miners and gold seekers from the Urique and Batopilas mines in the nearby mountains of the Sierra Madre Occidental and its branches. 
 
In 1824, El Fuerte became the capital city of the newly created Mexican state of Sonora y Sinaloa (reaching up deep into modern-day Arizona). It remained the capital for several years until the split of this state into the states of Sinaloa and Sonora.

Tourism 

Tourism remains a major industry in town, although it has been diminished in recent years by tourists being wary of Mexican drug cartel violence in other parts of Sinaloa; however, violence declined by 2013 from a high in 2011.  El Fuerte has several holidays and local "Fiestas" which are celebrated with pageants, "Ferias" and the like. Several hotels cater to hunters and fishermen, who hunt (deer, boar, wild hog, wild goat, rabbit, armadillo, a variety of snakes) in the foothills or fish in the nearby Rio Fuerte river which runs on the northwest part of the town's commercial district. There are also local petroglyphs a short distance from the downtown.  The city also serves as a gateway to the popular Barrancas del Cobre (Copper Canyon) situated in the nearby state of Chihuahua.  There are no easily travelled roads to Copper Canyon from west of the Sierra Madre Occidental.

Transport

Passenger trains
Visitors usually take the Ferrocarril Chihuahua al Pacífico railway, whose local station is a few miles south of town. The route is on the Chihuahua-Pacific Railroad, or ChePe, which passes through the scenic Copper Canyon, from Chihuahua, Chihuahua to the northeast, to Los Mochis, Sinaloa, near the Gulf of California, to the southwest.

The town is also served by El Fuerte Airport.

Climate

Sister cities
 Southlake, Texas, United States

External links
http://www.sinaloa.gob.mx/conociendo/municipios/elfuerte.htm
http://www.elfuerte.gob.mx/
https://web.archive.org/web/20111218024438/http://coppercanyonmexico.com/trip-details/el-chepe-the-train/

Populated places in Sinaloa
Populated places established in 1563
Pueblos Mágicos
1563 establishments in New Spain